Adeney is an English locative name from Adeney. Notable people with this surname include:

 Bernard Adeney (1878–1966), English painter
 Chris Adeney, Canadian singer-songwriter better known by his stage name Wax Mannequin
 David Howard Adeney (1911–1994), British missionary to China
 Peter Adeney, financial blogger known as Mr. Money Mustache
 Richard Adeney (1920–2010), English flautist
 Walter Frederic Adeney (1849–1920), English biblical scholar

See also 
 Adney, variant spelling
 Swaine Adeney Brigg

References 

English toponymic surnames